The 12th constituency of Budapest is one of the single member constituencies of the National Assembly, the national legislature of Hungary. The constituency standard abbreviation: Budapest 12. OEVK.

Since 2018, it has been represented by László Hajdu of the DK.

Geography
The 12th constituency is located in northern part of Pest.

List of districts
The constituency includes the following municipalities:

 District XV.: Full part of the district.
 District IV.: Eastern part of Árpád út.

Members
The constituency was first represented by Tamás László of the Fidesz from 2014 to 2018. László Hajdu of the DK was elected in 2018.

References

Budapest 12th